Jamal Marcus Baptiste (born 11 November 2003) is an English professional footballer who plays as a defender for West Ham United.

Club career
Baptiste joined West Ham United at the age of eight. In the 2018–19 season, Baptiste broke into West Ham's under-18 squad, whilst still a schoolboy. Baptiste later debuted for the under-23's at the age of 15, becoming the second youngest ever player to represent West Ham's under-23 side. Upon his 17th birthday, on 11 November 2020, Baptiste signed his first professional contract with West Ham. On 23 January 2021, Baptiste made his debut, as a substitute, for West Ham in a 4–0 FA Cup win against Doncaster Rovers.

International career
In October 2019, after previously representing England's under-16 side, Baptiste was called up for England's under-17's for the first time.

On 2 September 2021, Baptiste made his debut for England U19, starting a 2–0 victory over Italy U19's at St George's Park.

Style of play
Terry Westley, academy manager at West Ham during Baptiste's formative years, has praised Baptiste's height, power and pace. West Ham defender Angelo Ogbonna has lauded Baptiste's composure, with former West Ham striker Carlton Cole comparing Baptiste to former West Ham academy graduate Rio Ferdinand after coaching Baptiste in the club's academy. Baptiste himself has said he models his game on Virgil van Dijk and former West Ham and England defender Matthew Upson.

Career statistics

References

2003 births
Living people
Association football defenders
English footballers
Black British sportspeople
West Ham United F.C. players
England youth international footballers
Footballers from the London Borough of Redbridge